The Asia/Oceania Zone was one of the three zones of regional Davis Cup competition in 2014.

In the Asia/Oceania Zone there were four different groups in which teams competed against each other to advance to the next group.

Teams

Group A

Group B
 
 
  (promoted to group III)
  (promoted to group III)

Format
The ten teams were split into two round robin pools of five, with the winning nation from each pool playing against the runner-up from the other pool in promotion play-off matches. The winning teams from these matches were promoted to Group III in 2015.

The ties were played on the week commencing 9 June 2014 at Tehran, Iran and were played on outdoor clay courts.

Groups

Group A

Pacific Oceania vs. Kyrgyzstan

Jordan vs. Bangladesh

Pacific Oceania vs. Bangladesh

Jordan vs. Iraq

Pacific Oceania vs. Jordan

Iraq vs. Kyrgyzstan

Pacific Oceania vs. Iraq

Bangladesh vs. Kyrgyzstan

Jordan vs. Kyrgyzstan

Bangladesh vs. Iraq

Group B

Qatar vs. Mongolia

Saudi Arabia vs. Oman

Qatar vs. Oman

Saudi Arabia vs. Bahrain

Qatar vs. Saudi Arabia

Bahrain vs. Mongolia

Qatar vs. Bahrain

Oman vs. Mongolia

Saudi Arabia vs. Mongolia

Oman vs. Bahrain

Play-offs

1st to 4th play-off

Pacific Oceania vs. Qatar

Jordan vs. Saudi Arabia

5th to 6th play-off

Bangladesh vs. Mongolia

7th to 8th play-off

Iraq vs. Bahrain

9th to 10th play-off

Kyrgyzstan vs. Oman

References

External links
Official Website

Asia Oceania Zone IV
Davis Cup Asia/Oceania Zone